Mycalesis intermedia, the intermediate bushbrown, is a species of satyrine butterfly found in Burma, Cambodia, Thailand, Peninsular Malaysia, Langkawi Island, Indochina, southern Yunnan and India.

References
 Fleming, by W.A. (1975). Butterflies of West Malaysia and Singapore. Longman, Malaysia.
 Corbet, A.S. and H.M. Pendlebury.(1993). The Butterflies of the Malay Peninsula. The Malayan Nature Society.

Mycalesis
Butterflies of Asia
Butterflies of Indochina